The 2016–17 East Midlands Counties Football League season was the 9th in the history of East Midlands Counties Football League, a football competition in England.

League

The league featured 18 clubs from the previous season, along with four new clubs:
Belper United, promoted from the Central Midlands Football League
Birstall United, promoted from the Leicestershire Senior League
Dunkirk, relegated from the Midland Football League
West Bridgford, promoted from the Nottinghamshire Senior League

League table

References

External links
 East Midlands Counties Football League official site

2016–17
10